Gretchen Wyler (born Gretchen Patricia Wienecke; February 16, 1932 – May 27, 2007) was an American actress and dancer. She was also an animal rights advocate and founder of the Genesis Awards for animal protection.

Biography

Early life
Wyler was born Gretchen Patricia Wienecke in Oklahoma City, Oklahoma, the daughter of Peggy (née Highley) and Louis Gustave Wienecke, a petroleum engineer. She was raised in Bartlesville, Oklahoma and opened her own dancing school there before going to New York City to pursue a career as a professional actress and dancer.

Acting career
She appeared on Broadway in six original productions:
 Guys and Dolls as a dancer and as understudy for "Miss Adelaide" (1950–1953)
 Silk Stockings as "Janice Dayton" (1955–1956)
 Damn Yankees as "Lola" as replacement for Gwen Verdon (1955–1957)
 Rumple as "Kate Drew" (1957)
 Bye Bye Birdie as "Rose Grant" as replacement for Chita Rivera (1960–1961)
 Sly Fox as "Miss Fancy" (1976–1978)

She also appeared at the 1964 World's Fair alternating with Chita Rivera in Wonder World. The Michael Kidd/Jule Styne extravaganza played at the outdoor amphitheater. Eventually she went west to Hollywood to pursue movie stardom, which eluded her, but did co-star in the sitcom On Our Own (1977-1978) and appeared on many television programs, ranging from The Phil Silvers Show (aka Sergeant Bilko) to Naked City to Somerset, Diagnosis: Unknown, Charlie's Angels, Dallas, St. Elsewhere, Remington Steele, Falcon Crest, Santa Barbara, Punky Brewster, MacGyver, Who's the Boss, Designing Women, Friends, and Judging Amy. She made a number of appearances as a panelist on the game show To Tell the Truth; her last television appearance was on Chicken Soup for the Soul.

She appeared in Rick McKay's 2004 award-winning feature documentary, Broadway: The Golden Age, by the Legends Who Were There, in which she recounted her "aggressive" nature and an almost Eve Harrington-esque ambition, when she recalled trying on the star (Yvonne Adair)'s outfits when she was merely second understudy in the pre-Broadway touring production of Silk Stockings. When Adair collapsed in the middle of a show one night, and the first understudy (Sherry O'Neil) had surreptitiously gone to New York City to audition for another play (which Wyler knew), Wyler stepped in, and played the role when the show arrived on Broadway. Wyler had already filmed her appearance in McKay's sequel, Broadway: Beyond the Golden Age (2008) before she died.

Animal welfare activism
In 1966, Wyler began to work for animal welfare causes after visiting a dilapidated dog shelter in Warwick, N.Y. In 1972, she became the first woman to serve on the board for the American Society for the Prevention of Cruelty to Animals. In 1986, she was Vice Chairperson of The Fund for Animals. In 1991, she founded The Ark Trust, presenter of the annual Genesis Awards for animal protection; this event is now a program of The Humane Society of the United States. In 2005, Wyler was inducted into the U.S. Animal Rights Hall of Fame for her dedicated career in animal advocacy. In 2007, the first Gretchen Wyler Award was given to Paul McCartney.

Wyler was a vegetarian.

Death
Wyler died on May 27, 2007, aged 75, from complications of breast cancer.

Filmography

See also
 List of animal rights advocates

References

Further reading
Wyler, Gretchen (1985). "Gretchen Wyler Autobiography". Between the Species. 1 (2): 49–50. .

External links
"Broadway: The Golden Age" - Wyler's last film

1932 births
2007 deaths
American female dancers
Dancers from Oklahoma
American animal welfare workers
American musical theatre actresses
American stage actresses
American television actresses
Deaths from breast cancer
People from Camarillo, California
People from Bartlesville, Oklahoma
Actresses from Oklahoma City
Deaths from cancer in California
20th-century American actresses
Singers from Oklahoma
20th-century American singers
20th-century American women singers
20th-century American dancers
21st-century American women